Deleted in esophageal cancer 1 is a protein that in humans is encoded by the DEC1 gene.

Function 

The function of this gene is not known. This gene is located in a region commonly deleted in esophageal squamous cell carcinomas.  Gene expression is reduced or absent in these carcinomas, associated with lymph node metastasis, and thus this is a candidate tumor suppressor gene for esophageal squamous cell carcinomas.

References

Further reading